This is a list of diplomatic missions in Chennai. Governments of several foreign nations have established diplomatic and trade representation in the city of Chennai. Many of them are at the consulate-general or deputy high commission level, in addition to a number of honorary consulates, with their respective embassies located at New Delhi. The consular presence in the city dates back to 1794, when William Abbott was appointed U.S. consular agent for South India. As of 2022, there were 60 foreign representations in Chennai, including 16 consulates general and 28 honorary consulates. The list is of countries that have established a resident consular presence in the city.

For other diplomatic missions in India, see List of diplomatic missions in India.

Missions

Proposed missions
The agreement for establishing the Consulate General of People's Republic of China in Chennai, the capital city of the state of Tamil Nadu had been signed by the prime minister of India Narendra Modi and Chinese premier Li Keqiang, during Modi's three-day visit to China in May 2015.

In August 2017, Bangladesh government approved the opening of a consulate in Chennai. This will be open before the end of 2019. In addition, the countries of United Arab Emirates, Saudi Arabia and Kuwait and Egypt have decided to open their diplomatic consulates in the city.

See also

List of diplomatic missions of India
List of diplomatic missions in India

References

External links
 Embassy & Consulates, Government of India Portal
 Foreign Consulates in Chennai
 India—Embassies and Consulates
 Foreign Embassies and Consulates in India

Diplomatic missions in India
Diplomatic missions in Chennai
diplomatic missions
diplomatic missions, Chennai
diplomatic missions
Diplomatic missions in Chennai